Saul Levitt (March 13, 1911 – 1977) was an American playwright and author, best known for his successful play The Andersonville Trial, based on MacKinlay Kantor's Pulitzer-Prize-winning novel Andersonville.  Levitt's play was later made into an Emmy award-winning movie.

Levitt was born in New York City and died of heart failure on September 30, 1977.

Levitt served with the United States Army Air Corps in World War II as a B-17 bomber crewman with the 100th Bomb Group, flying missions against the Third Reich out of Thorpe Abbotts, UK.  Early in his tour, he was severely injured in a traffic accident and was transferred to the reporting staff of Yank magazine, where he wrote and published a number of articles about his group's experiences flying and fighting in the war.

Works
The Sun is Silent (1951)
The Andersonville Trial (1960)
The True Glory (1945)
A Covenant with Death (1967)
The Trial of the Catonsville Nine (1972)

Awards
 Primetime Emmy Award for Outstanding Writing Achievement in Drama - Adaptation for: The Andersonville Trial (1970) (TV)

References

External links
 

1911 births
1977 deaths
American dramatists and playwrights
Emmy Award winners
Writers from New York City
United States Army Air Forces personnel of World War II